Axminster Rural District is a former district council area based around Axminster, Devon. It was administered by Axminster Rural District Council. It was created in 1894 and abolished in 1974.

References

Districts of England abolished by the Local Government Act 1972
Local government districts in Devon